Heinz Busche (born 6 September 1951) is a West German bobsledder who competed in the late 1970s. He won the gold medal in the four-man event at the 1979 FIBT World Championships in Königssee.

At the 1980 Winter Olympics in Lake Placid, Busche finished seventh in the four-man event and eighth in the two-man event.

References
Bobsleigh four-man world championship medalists since 1924
Wallenchinsky, David (1984). "Bobsled". In The Complete Book of the Olympics: 1896 - 1980. New York: Penguin Books. pp. 559, 562.

Bobsledders at the 1980 Winter Olympics
German male bobsledders
German male sprinters
Living people
1951 births
Olympic bobsledders of West Germany